Oded Golan (born 1951 in Tel Aviv) is an Israeli engineer, entrepreneur, and antiquities collector. He owns one of the largest collections of Biblical archaeology in the world.

Golan was accused by the Israel Antiquities Authority (IAA) of involvement in the forgery of one half of the James Ossuary inscription, the Jehoash Inscription and other items. Golan denied any involvement in forgery, and argued that he purchased the two items from licensed antiquities dealers in 1976 and 1999 respectively.

Four other defendants were indicted along with Golan, including two of the largest antiquities dealers in Israel. In 2012, the court acquitted Golan of forgery and fraud, but convicted him of illegal trading in antiquities. 
In late 2013, the Supreme Court ordered the State to return to Golan the James Ossuary, the Jehoash Inscription and hundreds of other items that had been confiscated by the IAA “for the purpose of investigation."

Background
The son of an engineer and a professor of microbiology, Golan served as an officer in the Israel Defense Forces before studying industrial and management engineering at the Technion, graduating with honors.

He was then involved with several hi-tech ventures, developed and operated global professional training seminars and tour programs, and subsequently went on to be involved in real estate development in Israel. Since childhood, Golan has had a keen interest in archeology and antiquities. At the age of 10, during a visit to the ancient site of Tel Hatzor, he discovered the world’s oldest dictionary, which was later published by Professor Yigael Yadin. At the age of 12, Golan participated in excavations at Masada.

Golan's Collection 
Golan's collection, amassed over a period of more than 50 years, contains thousands of archaeological artifacts, the vast majority of which were purchased from antiquities dealers, mostly in East Jerusalem.

Golan’s collection includes a wide range of artifacts which together represent the culture of Israel and TransJordan from the fifth millennium BCE to the fifth century AD.  Among the items that attracted international attention is the James Ossuary, the bone box possibly used to intern the bones of James, brother of Jesus.

IAA claims and trial 
Following statements made by the Israel Antiquities Authority (IAA) in June 2003 challenging the authenticity of the inscriptions or the patina on the inscriptions of the James Ossuary and the Jehoash Tablet, the IAA confiscated both items from Golan, along with hundreds of other items of antiquity, allegedly for the purposes of the investigation.

The IAA publicly stated that Golan and numerous antiquity dealers were involved in forgery, assisted by experts in ancient Semitic languages, and cautioned that according to IAA policy all items discovered outside official excavations should be suspected as being forged. Media coverage and documentary films which reported the IAA claims  were accompanied by rumors, creating what Golan called a “media circus".

The BBC reported that when the police took Oded Golan into custody and searched his apartment they discovered a workshop with a range of tools, materials, and half finished 'antiquities'. This was presented as evidence for an operation on a great scale. According to other allegations, collectors around the world have paid hundreds of thousands of dollars for artifacts that came through Oded Golan's associates. Dozens of these items were examined. Police then suspected that artefacts made by the same team of forgers have found their way into leading museums around the world.

The documentary film The History Merchants alleged Golan (working with a team of people, including an expert in ancient semitic languages and an artisan) had produced a number of forged artifacts for sale on the religious antiquities market. In 2004, Horizon aired King Solomon's Tablet of Stone on the BBC.  This program included allegations of forgery and fraudulent activity by Golan.

On December 29, 2004, Golan was indicted in an Israeli court along with three antiquities dealers; Robert Deutsch, one of Israel’s most important licensed antiquities dealer and an inscriptions expert who has lectured at the University of Haifa; dealer and conservator Refael Braun; and dealer Shlomo Cohen; Faiz al-Amla, a Palestinian dealer from the village of Beit Ula in the Hebron Hills was charged with trading in antiquities without a license. Early in the trial, charges were dropped against Braun and Cohen, leaving Golan and Deutsch as the only defendants.

Golan denied any involvement in forgery and argued that he had purchased the inscriptions from licensed antiquities dealers. In the trial, Golan presented evidence that proved that he had purchased the James Ossuary in 1976 and the Jehoash Table in 1999. Golan stated that to the best of his understanding and judgment, these are authentic ancient inscriptions.

Court ruling and acquittal 
In a trial that lasted almost eight years (2004-2012), the District Court of Jerusalem heard testimony relating to the authenticity of the inscriptions on the James Ossuary and the Jehoash Tablet from over 50 experts from a wide range of fields, who examined the inscriptions and submitted dozens of scientific reports, and 70 other witnesses including antiquities dealers and well-known collectors. Trial transcripts covered over 12,000 pages, and the court ruling was 438 pages long.

Trial aftermath 
The IAA announced that they accept the court’s ruling. The State accepted the main decision of the District Court and did not appeal against the judgment. After the judgment, the State moved to confiscate the James Ossuary and the Jehoash Tablet for the State Treasury, arguing that these items may well be of enormous historic, religious and archeological significance and therefore should not remain in private hands. The District Court and the Supreme Court denied this motion and ordered the State to return to Golan all the antiquities that had been taken from him. The James Ossuary and the Jehoash Tablet, as well as hundreds of other antiquities, were returned to Golan in late 2013.

Further reading
Nina Burleigh,  (2008):  Unholy Business: A True Tale of Faith, Greed and Forgery in the Holy Land

See also
Three shekel ostracon

Notes

References

External links 
Alleged forger of Holy Land antiquities held 23/07/2003, Haaretz, 		
"Written in Stone," David Samuels, A Reporter at Large,  The New Yorker,  April 12, 2004, p. 48
Oded Golan's refutation of the documentary's claims
Review of The History Merchants
UK Daily Telegraph investigative article (May 2005)
The art of authentic forgery  by Nadav Shragai, 14/04/2008  Haaretz,
King Solomon's Tablet of Stone
The Authenticity of the James Ossuary and the Jehoash Tablet Inscriptions – Summary of Expert Trial Witnesses, Oded Golan (2011)

1951 births
Living people
20th-century Israeli engineers
21st-century Israeli engineers
Israeli collectors
Archaeological forgery
Technion – Israel Institute of Technology alumni
People from Tel Aviv
Israeli criminals
People acquitted of fraud
Tel Hazor